Sarah Jane Vowell (born December 27, 1969) is an American author, journalist, essayist, social commentator and voice actress. She has written seven nonfiction books on American history and culture. She was a contributing editor for the radio program This American Life on Public Radio International from 1996 to 2008, where she produced numerous commentaries and documentaries and toured the country in many of the program's live shows. She was also the voice of Violet Parr in the 2004 animated film The Incredibles and its 2018 sequel.

Early life and education
Sarah Vowell was born in Muskogee, Oklahoma. Her family moved to Bozeman, Montana when she was eleven. She has a fraternal twin sister, Amy. She earned a B.A. from Montana State University in 1993 in Modern Languages and Literature, and an M.A. from the School of the Art Institute of Chicago in 1999.

Career

Writing
Vowell's articles have been published in The Village Voice, Esquire, Spin Magazine, The New York Times, The Los Angeles Times, and SF Weekly. She has been a regular contributor to the online magazine Salon.com, and was one of the original contributors to McSweeney's, participating in many of the quarterly's readings and shows.

Vowell's first book, Radio On: A Listener's Diary (1997), which featured her year-long diary of listening to the radio in 1995, caught the attention of This American Life host Ira Glass, and it led to Vowell becoming a frequent contributor to the show. Thereafter, segments on the show became the subjects for many of her subsequent published essays. Vowell's first essay collection was Take the Cannoli (2000), which was followed by The Partly Cloudy Patriot (2002). 

In 2005, Vowell served as a guest columnist for The New York Times during several weeks in July, briefly filling in for Maureen Dowd. Vowell also served as a guest columnist in February 2006. Her book Assassination Vacation (2005) describes a road trip to tourist sites devoted to the murders of presidents Abraham Lincoln, James A. Garfield and William McKinley. Vowell's book, The Wordy Shipmates (2008), analyzes the settlement of the New England Puritans in America and their contributions to American history. Also in 2008, Vowell's essay about Montana appeared in the book State by State: A Panoramic Portrait of America.

Vowell wrote Unfamiliar Fishes (2011), which discusses the Overthrow of the Kingdom of Hawaii and the Newlands Resolution. In April 2011, the book became a New York Times Bestseller. In her Los Angeles Times review, Susan Salter Reynolds wrote that Vowell's "cleverness is gorgeously American: She collects facts and stores them like a nervous chipmunk, digesting them only for the sake of argument." Allegra Goodman, writing in The Washington Post, describes the work as "a big gulp of a book, printed as an extended essay... Lacking section or chapter breaks, Vowell's quirky history lurches from one anecdote to the next. These are often entertaining, but in the aggregate they begin to sound the same..." Goodman also wrote that "Vowell tells a good tale" with "shrewd observations", but that she found that "the narrative wears thin where casual turns cute and cute threatens to turn glib."

Her most recent book is Lafayette in the Somewhat United States (2015), an account of the Marquis de Lafayette, a French aristocrat who became George Washington's trusted officer and friend, and afterward an American celebrity. In a review for The New York Times, Charles P. Pierce wrote, "Vowell wanders through the history of the American Revolution and its immediate aftermath, using Lafayette's involvement in the war as a map, and bringing us all along in her perambulations… and doing it with a wink." NPR reviewer Colin Dwyer wrote, "It's awfully refreshing to see Vowell bring our founders down from their lofty pedestals. In her telling, they're just men again, not the gods we've long since made of them."

Public appearances and lectures

Vowell has appeared on television shows such as Nightline, The Daily Show with Jon Stewart, The Colbert Report, Jimmy Kimmel Live!, Late Show with David Letterman, and Late Night with Conan O'Brien.

In April 2006, Vowell served as the keynote speaker at the 27th Annual Kentucky Women Writers Conference. In August and September 2006, she toured the United States as part of the Revenge of the Book Eaters national tour, which benefited the children's literacy centers 826NYC, 826CHI, 826 Valencia, 826LA, 826 Michigan, and 826 Seattle.

Vowell also provided commentary in Robert Wuhl's 2005 Assume the Position with Mr. Wuhl HBO specials.

Voice and acting work
Vowell provided the voice of Violet Parr, a shy teenager, in the 2004 Pixar animated film The Incredibles, and returned to her role for the film's sequel, Incredibles 2, in 2018. Vowell also voiced the character in various related video games, and for Disney on Ice presentations in the years following the film's release. The makers of The Incredibles discovered Vowell in an episode of This American Life, "Guns", in which she and her father fire a homemade cannon. Pixar made a test animation for Violet using audio from that sequence, which was included on the DVD of The Incredibles. Vowell also wrote and was featured in a documentary included on the same DVD, entitled "Vowellett—An Essay by Sarah Vowell", in which she reflects on the difference between being an author of history books on assassinated presidents and voicing the superhero Violet, and on what the role meant to her nephew.

Vowell was featured prominently in the 2002 documentary about the alternative rock band, They Might Be Giants, entitled Gigantic: A Tale of Two Johns, and she appeared with band members John Linnell and John Flansburgh in the DVD commentary for the movie. She also provided commentary for the April 2006 episode, "Murder at the Fair: The Assassination of President McKinley," one of ten in the History Channel miniseries, 10 Days That Unexpectedly Changed America.

In September 2006, Vowell appeared as a minor character in the ABC drama Six Degrees.  She appeared in an episode of HBO's Bored to Death, as an interviewer in a bar, and in 2010, appeared briefly in the film Please Give, as a shopper. Vowell also appeared on The Daily Show as a Senior Historical Context Correspondent.

Personal life
Vowell claims to have a small amount of Cherokee ancestry (about 1/8 on her mother's side and 1/16 on her father's side). She is not a member of any tribe or nation. She retraced the path of the forced removal of the Cherokee from the southeastern United States to Oklahoma, known as the Trail of Tears, with her twin sister Amy. In 1998, This American Life chronicled her story, devoting the entire hour to her work. 

Vowell is on the advisory board of 826NYC, a nonprofit tutoring and writing center for students aged 6–18 in Brooklyn.

Vowell is an atheist, though she describes herself as "culturally Christian." In an interview with The A.V. Club, when asked if she believed in a god, she stated, "Absolutely not."

Selected published works
 1997—Radio On: A Listener's Diary, .
 2000—Take the Cannoli: Stories From the New World, .
 2002—The Partly Cloudy Patriot, .
 2005—Assassination Vacation, .
 2008—The Wordy Shipmates, .
 2011—Unfamiliar Fishes, .
 2015—Lafayette in the Somewhat United States, .

Filmography

Film

Television

Video games

Short film

References

External links

 Sarah Vowell author page
 Sarah Vowell page at This American Life
 Steven Barclay Agency, Sarah Vowell page
 
 
 

1969 births
Actresses from Oklahoma
American atheists
American columnists
American essayists
American travel writers
American women travel writers
American voice actresses
Living people
Montana State University alumni
People from Manhattan
Writers from Muskogee, Oklahoma
School of the Art Institute of Chicago alumni
This American Life people
American twins
21st-century American historians
Historians from New York (state)
21st-century American women writers
American women historians
American women columnists